Johann Wenzel Peter was born September 9, 1745 in Karlsbad in the now-Czech Republic and died December 28, 1829 in Rome, Italy. Peter is known for his animal paintings which appear in the Vatican Museums and frescos which are on the walls of the Galleria Borghese.

Pope Gregory XVI furnished the Room of the Consistory in the Papal State Apartment with twenty works purchased from Peter.

Highlighted works

References

1745 births
1829 deaths
Austrian painters
Austrian male painters
People from Karlovy Vary